Menace is a 1934 American mystery film directed by Ralph Murphy.

Cast
 Gertrude Michael - Helen Chalmers
 Paul Cavanagh - Col. Leonard Crecy
 Henrietta Crosman - Sybil Thornton
 John Lodge - Ronald Cavendish
 Ray Milland - Freddie Bastion 
 Berton Churchill - Norman Bellamy
 Halliwell Hobbes - Skinner
 Robert Allen - Andrew Forsythe
 Forrester Harvey - Wilcox
 Montagu Love - Police Inspector
 Arletta Duncan - Gloria Chalmers

References

External links

1934 mystery films
Films directed by Ralph Murphy
American mystery films
American black-and-white films
1930s American films
1930s English-language films